M138 can refer to:
M138 bomblet
M-138 (Michigan highway)
Snecma M138, a proposed turboprop engine for the Airbus A400M aircraft